Mitchell "Mitch" Laurance (born Mitchell Dycoff) is an American film and television actor and sports broadcaster.

Early life, family and education
Mitchell Dycoff was born in Queens, New York City, New York and raised in Hewlett, New York. He has an identical twin brother, Matthew (born four minutes later), who is also a professional actor.

Both brothers are graduates of Tufts University.

Career
Mitchell Laurance and his identical twin brother Matthew Laurance appear occasionally together, beginning when they were children in a margarine TV commercial which featured identical twins, and later in an episode of the TV series Cop Rock. Although Matthew was a performer on Saturday Night Live for its sixth season, Mitchell also appeared in uncredited roles on the show for a few seasons (1977–80) and was an associate director and producer for the show.

In 1989, Mitchell was in a memorable AT&T commercial where he played a man in a phone booth trying to dial Phoenix and was instead repeatedly getting Fiji.

Mitchell appeared on Not Necessarily the News during the 1980s. Other recurring roles were on the TV series, including the very short-lived series Roxie (1987; most of the episodes were unaired), L.A. Law (1987−88), Reasonable Doubts (1992–93), Matlock (1988−95), and Dawson's Creek. Guest roles have ranged from Laverne & Shirley, CHiPs, The Outer Limits, One Tree Hill, Night Court, Prison Break, MacGyver, Beauty and the Beast, Midnight Caller, Empty Nest, and Jake and the Fatman. He was in the "Apollo One" episode of the mini-series From the Earth to the Moon (1998). In the early 1990s he performed the role of Ben Arnold on the soap opera Santa Barbara.

He also has acted in feature films such as Stepfather II, The Runestone, The Hand That Rocks the Cradle, and Urban Mythology, and TV movies (especially in the 1990s) including The Almost Perfect Bank Robbery, Perfect Crime, To Love, Honor and Deceive, Kiss and Tell, Deadly Pursuits, Inflammable, and Death in Small Doses.

He has been a radio disk jockey at WFMZ, a sports radio station in Charlotte, North Carolina. He has hosted billiards tournaments and has provided sports commentary for ESPN. He has also been the host of a golf podcast, Golf Connections with Mitch Laurance.

Personal life
Laurance is married to Ewa Laurance (née Svensson; formerly known as Ewa Mataya), a billiards world champion (a member of the Billiards Congress of America Hall of Fame) and model. They reside in Myrtle Beach, South Carolina

He is a golf enthusiast, having played in pro-am golf tournaments.

References

External links
 

Living people
American male film actors
American male television actors
1950 births
People from Queens, New York
Male actors from New York City
20th-century American male actors
21st-century American male actors
Tufts University alumni
Identical twin male actors
American twins
People from Hewlett, New York